Associazione Sportiva Dilettantistica Santhià Calcio Italian association football club, based in Santhià, Piedmont. The team reached its peak playing in Serie C and Serie D from 2011 to 2016

History
The club was founded in 1903.

Colors and badge
The team's color is dark-red.

References

External links
Official site

Football clubs in Piedmont and Aosta Valley
Association football clubs established in 1903
1903 establishments in Italy